Julian Ocleppo and Andrea Vavassori were the defending champions but chose to defend their title with different partners. Ocleppo partnered Andrea Pellegrino but lost in the first round to David Marrero and Roberto Maytín. Vavassori partnered Andrei Vasilevski but lost in the final to Tomislav Brkić and Ante Pavić.

Brkić and Pavić won the title after defeating Vasilevski and Vavassori 7–6(8–6), 6–2 in the final.

Seeds

Draw

References

External links
 Main draw

Aspria Tennis Cup - Doubles
2019 Doubles